Zhang Boxing (born August 1930) is a retired Chinese politician. He was born in Bazhou City, Hebei. He received his university education in Xi'an. He was governor (1986–1987), Chinese Communist Party Committee Secretary (1987–1994) and People's Congress Chairman (1993–1998) of Shaanxi. He was a delegate to the 8th National People's Congress.

References

1930 births
People's Republic of China politicians from Hebei
Chinese Communist Party politicians from Hebei
Governors of Shaanxi
Delegates to the 8th National People's Congress
Living people
People from Bazhou, Hebei